Salsano is an Italian surname.  Notable people with the surname include:

 Fausto Salsano (born 1962), Italian football manager and former player
 SallyAnn Salsano (born ), American television producer

Italian-language surnames